WVFX (channel 10) is a television station licensed to Clarksburg, West Virginia, United States, serving North-Central West Virginia as an affiliate of Fox and The CW Plus. It is owned by Gray Television alongside Weston-licensed CBS affiliate WDTV (channel 5). The two stations share studios on Television Drive in Bridgeport (along I-79/Jennings Randolph Expressway); WVFX's transmitter is located in an unincorporated area between Clarksburg and Arlington.

History
The station signed on February 8, 1981, and aired an analog signal on UHF channel 46. It was a religious independent station using the calls WLYJ (standing for "We Love You Jesus"). Much of the programming consisted of national religious evangelicals and local fund-raising appeals to continue operation of the station. In 1998, WLYJ was sold to Davis Television and converted to a Fox affiliate. The call sign was changed to WVFX (standing for "West Virginia's Fox"). Prior to WVFX's affiliation with Fox, the network's programming was only available on cable via Pittsburgh affiliate WPGH-TV.

Davis Television sold WVFX to Withers Broadcasting in 2007. Since the Clarksburg–Weston–Fairmont market has only five full-power stations, this amount is too few to allow a duopoly under normal Federal Communications Commission (FCC) guidelines. However, Withers obtained a "failed station" waiver allowing the purchase to go through. Although most internal operations were integrated with WDTV in Bridgeport, WVFX initially maintained its original facility on West Pike Street/SR 20 in Downtown Clarksburg. The station's signal is very hard to receive over-the-air since much of the region is a rugged dissected plateau. As a result, it relies primarily on cable and satellite for viewership.

Despite this technicality, the station is still able to sell commercials to businesses in that area. Locations around Morgantown are within reach of over-the-air signals from Pittsburgh stations. In addition to WVFX, most cable providers offer WPGH-TV on their basic tiers. In some cases, that station's high definition feed is offered on the digital tiers instead of WVFX.

Gray Television announced on May 13, 2016, that it would acquire WVFX and WDTV from Withers for $26.5 million. Gray sought a continuation of the "failing station" waiver allowing WVFX to be co-owned with WDTV, and assumed control of the stations through a local marketing agreement on June 1. The sale was completed on May 1, 2017.

Programming

Syndicated programming
Syndicated programming on WVFX includes Family Feud, Divorce Court, Pawn Stars, The Drew Barrymore Show, The Kelly Clarkson Show, 25 Words or Less, and Mom, among others.

Newscast
After acquiring WVFX, WDTV made preparations to begin producing a prime time newscast on this station. Launched in late 2010, the show is called Fox 10 News at 10 and airs weeknights for thirty minutes. The broadcast features the News Corp. Digital Media music theme from OSI Music and graphics package modified from original use on Fox owned-and-operated stations.

Technical information

Subchannels
The station's digital signal is multiplexed:

Analog-to-digital conversion
WVFX shut down its analog signal, over UHF channel 46, on June 12, 2009, the official date in which full-power television in the United States transitioned from analog to digital broadcasts under federal mandate. The station's digital signal broadcasts on its pre-transition VHF channel 10, and also converted their virtual channel to 10 on the same date to take advantage of that channel number's better branding potential.

References

Television channels and stations established in 1981
1981 establishments in West Virginia
VFX
Fox network affiliates
The CW affiliates
Start TV affiliates
Gray Television